Shuvo or Shubho or Subho (শুভ) is a Bengali name meaning "prosperous" or "auspicious"  that may refer to:

Surname 
Shuvo Kumar Chowdhury (born 1999), Bangladeshi singer and songwriter
Arifin Shuvo (born 1982), Bangladeshi actor 
Kazi Shuvo, Bangladeshi singer 

Bengali-language surnames
Bengali words and phrases
Bangladeshi masculine given names